Voivodes of Transylvania named Nicholas  include the following:

 Nicholas I, voivode (1201/1201–1202)
 Nicholas II, voivode (1213)
 Nicholas Pok or Meggyesi, voivode (1277–1278; 1315–1316)
 Nicholas Sirokay, voivode (1342–1344)
 Nicholas Kont, voivode (1351–1356)
 Nicholas Lackfi, Jr., voivode (1367–1368)
 Nicholas Csáki, voivode (1402–1403; 1415–1426)
 Nicholas Marcali, voivode (1402–1403)
 Nicholas Újlaki, voivode (1441–1458; 1462–1465)
 Nicholas Kanizsai, voivode (1461)
 Nicholas Csupor, voivode (1468–1474)